Ibrahim Elsadig (born born 3 January 1999) is a Qatari born-Sudanese footballer who plays as a midfielder for Muaither.

References

External links
 

1999 births
Living people
Qatari footballers
Qatari people of Sudanese descent
Naturalised citizens of Qatar
Sudanese emigrants to Qatar
Association football midfielders
Qatar Stars League players
Qatari Second Division players
Muaither SC players
Umm Salal SC players